Canadian federal elections have provided the following results in Eastern Quebec.

Regional Profile
Until 1984, this region of Quebec was Liberal territory. Social Credit also did well here, winning in Rimouski and in Bellechasse in 1979. Brian Mulroney, a native of this area, was able to sweep this region for the Conservatives in 1984 and 1988, using the strong nationalist sentiment in the area.   

That nationalist support transferred to the Bloc Québécois, which dominated this region for the better part of two decades; the Liberals only won Montmagny in 1997 and the Bonaventure region in 1993. When the BQ experienced a decline in 2000, the Liberals were able to win in the Gaspé, and took Lévis in a by-election. When the Liberals collapsed in Quebec, the Bloc regained all their lost seats in 2004. One of those seats, however was lost to the Conservatives in 2006, and the Tories got another in a 2009.  Hopes of further Bloc gains were dashed in 2011, as they were cut down to only one seat, with the NDP seizing one seat each from the Bloc and the Tories (the latter on a judicial recount).

Liberal support recovered strongly in 2015 allowing them to gain 2 seats, at the expense of the NDP, their first in the region since 2000. The Bloc was shut out as the Conservatives made a gain (on judicial recount) in Montmagny.

The Bloc reappeared in the region in 2019, picking up two seats from the Liberal. No seat exchanged hands in 2021, with all the outgoing MPs reelected. The only change was in Bellechasse where Dominique Vien, former provincial cabinet minister, succeeded Steven Blaney who was not seeking reelection.

Votes by party throughout time

2019 - 43nd general election

2015 - 42nd general election

2011 - 41st general election

2008 - 40th general election

2006 - 39th general election

2004 - 38th general election

Maps 

Gaspésie-Îles-de-la-Madeleine
Lévis-Bellechasse
Matapédia-Matane
Rimouski-Témiscouata
Rivière-du-Loup-Montmagny

2000 - 37th general election

1997 - 36th general election

1993 - 35th general election 

Eastern

fr:Élections fédérales canadiennes en Bas-Saint-Laurent et Gaspésie–Îles-de-la-Madeleine